Girl Next Door was a Japanese pop musical trio that debuted in 2008 on the Avex Trax label. The band consists of vocalist Chisa, guitarist Yuji Inoue and Daisuke Suzuki on keyboard. On September 3, 2013, the group's fifth anniversary, the band formally announced plans to dissolve Girl Next Door within the year. Their final performance as a group was held at SHIBUYA-AX on December 8, 2013.

History
Girl Next Door was formed in March, and subsequently made their official debut in September 2008. Originally a dancer in the Kansai area, Chisa entered the Avex Artist Academy in 2005, and met Daisuke Suzuki (keyboardist) who was a respectable songwriter. Chisa and Suzuki recorded many demo tracks which eventually caught the eye of Avex CEO, Max Matsuura. Yuji Inoue(Guitarist) then joined the two, and Girl Next Door was formed and debuted with their 1st single:  in September 2008.

Chisa was born on November 16, 1985 and grew up in Hyōgo Prefecture. Girl Next Door's debut single, "Gūzen no Kakuritsu", was placed online on several sites from May 29, 2008. , there were two million views. Over a period of three months from their debut, they have released three singles. On December 24, 2008, they released their self-titled debut album including songs from the three singles. On December 22, 2008, the band's official fanclub "Next Door" opened.

The band's fifth single "Infinity" was released on June 10, 2009. It is also the theme song for the 2009 Spring TV show Atashinchi no Danshi and became their first No. 1 single on Oricon weekly single charts. They also sang the OP song of the game Tales of VS. using the song "Be Your Wings". The trio released their 6th single "Be Your Wings/Friendship/Wait for You" on August 5, 2009. It was their first triple A-side single.

On January 20, 2010, they released their second album Next Future including songs from the four singles and became their first No. 1 album with the first week sales of around 56,000 copies on Oricon weekly album charts.

Discography

Singles

Albums

References

External links
 

Avex Trax artists
Japanese rock music groups
Japanese pop music groups
Japanese house music groups
Musical groups established in 2008
Musical groups disestablished in 2013
Musical groups from Tokyo